"Dear Jessie" is the debut single of German singer Rollergirl. The chorus of the song with the same title by American singer-songwriter Madonna was used in this song. Rollergirl released it as the lead single in May 1999 from her debut album, Now I'm Singin'... And the Party Keeps On Rollin. It is produced by Alex Christensen from U96, and reached number two in Denmark and number ten in Norway.

Track listing
 CD single
 "Dear Jessie" (radio edit)
 "Dear Jessie" (Green Court Mix)
 "Dear Jessie" (Digglers Long Mix)
 "To Be an Instrumental"

Charts

Weekly charts

Year-end charts

References

1999 songs
1999 debut singles
Rollergirl songs
Universal Records singles
Song recordings produced by Alex Christensen
Songs written by Madonna
Songs written by Patrick Leonard